The International Journal of Stress Management is a quarterly peer-reviewed academic journal published by the American Psychological Association on behalf of the International Stress Management Association. The journal was established in 2003 and covers research on all aspects of stress management.

Abstracting and indexing 
The journal is abstracted and indexed in Scopus, PsycINFO, and CINAHL. According to the Journal Citation Reports, the journal has a 2020 impact factor of 3.387.

See also 
 Occupational health psychology
 Industrial and organizational psychology

References

External links 
 

American Psychological Association academic journals
English-language journals
Applied psychology journals
Quarterly journals
Publications established in 2003